Electricity Authority may refer to:

 British Electricity Authority
 Central Electricity Authority, United Kingdom
 Central Electricity Authority (India)
 Electricity Authority of Cambodia
 Electricity Authority of Cyprus
 Electricity Authority (Israel)
 Electricity Authority (New Zealand)
 Electricity Generating Authority of Thailand
 Manx Electricity Authority

See also
 Electricity Commission (disambiguation)